T. Edward Reed is a Canadian zoologist, anthropologist, and pediatrician. He became a junior geneticist at the University of Michigan's Heredity Clinic in 1952. He was appointed Professor and Chair of the Department of Zoology at the University of Toronto in 1960, succeeding Norma Ford Walker. Among Reed's doctoral students at the University of Toronto was Emoke Szathmary.

References

Living people
Academic staff of the University of Toronto
University of Michigan faculty
Alumni of the University of London
Canadian anthropologists
Canadian zoologists
Canadian pediatricians
Year of birth missing (living people)